SALSA d'Haïti was a Haitian regional airline headquartered at Toussaint Louverture International Airport in Port-au-Prince, Haiti. It flew several round trip flights daily between Cap-Haitien and Port-au-Prince.

History 
SALSA d'Haïti was a privately held airline formed in 2008 to provide service for travel within Haiti. SALSA d'Haïti held the IATA airline designator of SO (Sierra-Oscar), IATA accounting prefix of 340  and International Civil Aviation Organization (ICAO) airline designator of SLC (Sierra-Lima-Charlie).  SALSA also participates in the International Air Transport Association (IATA) Multilateral Prorate Agency - Passenger (MPA-P) and is a signatory of the IATA Prorate Agency Agreement (PAA). SALSA is an acronym for Services Aeriens Latinosamericains, S.A. d'Haïti (translated from French to English as "Latin American Air Services Corporation of Haiti").

While the primary focus of the airline was to serve the Haitian local population, international expansion was planned to further this goal to the large Haitian population living outside of Haiti while at the same time making foreign tourist travel to areas outside of Port-au-Prince available. SALSA had orders for additional turboprop aircraft to expand domestic operations to Port-de-Paix, Jérémie and Les Cayes. Additionally, jet-powered aircraft were to be added in 2011 to serve international destinations in Kingston, Jamaica and Ft. Lauderdale, Florida.  

Shortly after the 2010 Haiti earthquake on January 12, 2010, SALSA d'Haïti began organizing relief efforts with several non-governmental organizations and foreign governments to assist in the transportation of supplies into Port-au-Prince and other Haitian communities outside of the capital. Relief flights were flown throughout Haiti, as well as supply flights from Santo Domingo, Aruba and Curacao.  Charter flights for the Royal Dutch Marines, from their base in Willemstad, Curacao, were some of the first flights from outside the Haiti region.

In September 2011, SALSA d'Haïti was accepted as a member of the IATA Multilateral Interline Transport Agreement (MITA). The airline ceased operations in 2013.

Destinations 

SALSA maintained interline or codeshare agreements with the several airlines. Operations connected at Port-au-Prince where passengers had to transfer from the international airport to the domestic airport for onward transportation to domestic destinations. SALSA provided complementary transportation between the Port-au-Prince international and domestic terminals.

Fleet 

At the time of its closure, the airline operated the following aircraft:

Former fleet

Incidents and accidents
 On February 13, 2011 a SALSA Jetstream 31 arriving in Port-au-Prince from Cap Haitien experienced issues with the left-wing landing gear locking into landing position due to a hydraulics system failure.  After 30 minutes of attempting to drop the landing gear, the aircraft was forced to make an emergency landing with only two of the three wheels locked for landing. All 19 passengers and 2 crew members safely evacuated with minor injuries. The aircraft, HH-ANA, was significantly damaged.

 On September 20, 2011 a SALSA Beechcraft 99 went down outside of Cap Haitien.  2 pilots and 1 passenger were on board at the time of the incident, there were no survivors. Authorities are currently investigating the cause. This aircraft departed from Cap Haitien even though all but one passenger refused to go and other scheduled flights, including Tortug’Air, cancelled flights because of terrible weather conditions, between Cap Haitien and Port-au-Prince. Salsa  flew into a violent cumulo nimbus shortly after take off and crashed.

References

External links

2008 establishments in Haiti
Airlines established in 2008
Airlines disestablished in 2013
Defunct airlines of Haiti